or Kuchikami no sake  is a kind of rice-based alcohol produced by a process involving human saliva as a fermentation starter. Kuchikamizake was one of the earliest types of Japanese alcoholic drinks. Kuchi means "mouth", kami means "to chew" and zake is the rendaku form of "sake".

Description
Kuchikamizake is white in colour and has a sour taste. After two weeks of fermentation, it can achieve up to 7% ABV.

It is made from chewed rice; the mixture of the enzymes from saliva and rice result in the fermentation process.

Some islands in Okinawa Prefecture still held shinto ceremonies involving chewed sake until the 1930s.

Kuchikamizake is not considered the origin of nihonshu because of the differences of their times introduced to Japan, brewing methods and cultures.

See also
Chicha
Mead
 Kuchikamizake is featured as a plot element in the film Your Name.

References

Sake
Japanese alcoholic drinks
Japanese words and phrases
Rice wine